The IGA Cable Car, also known as Berlin Cableway, IGA Ropeway or IGA Cableway, is a -long gondola lift line serving and crossing the Erholungspark Marzahn in Berlin, capital of Germany. Built for the Internationale Gartenausstellung 2017 (IGA 2017), an international horticultural exhibition, it is the first cableway opened in the German capital.

History
On 27 February 2014, the contract between the Italian society Leitner AG, from South Tyrol, and the IGA Berlin 2017 GmbH, was signed for a new cableway. Leitner AG bears the costs for construction and operation of around 14 million EUR. The construction of the cableway started on 16 March 2016 and went on until the late summer of that year. In September 2016, the first testing trip started with the mayor Michael Müller. The official opening was on April 13, 2017 and the ride was be included in the admission ticket to the expo.

Route
The line runs , across the Erholungspark Marzahn, from the Kienbergpark to the Kienberg hill, and then down again to Blumberger Damm, at Gärten der Welt station. A journey takes five minutes, can transport 3,000 passengers per hour in both directions and there will be around 62 gondolas for ten people each.

The eastern terminus station, Kienbergpark, is linked with the U-Bahn station of Kienberg (Gärten der Welt), on the U5 line. Named "Neue Grottkauer Straße" until 2016, it was renamed in that way for the upcoming expo.

Other nearby stations are Cottbusser Platz (U5 line), 500 m from Kienbergpark station; and the tram stop "Adersleber Weg" (lines M8 and 18), 1 km west of Gärten der Welt station.

Gallery

See also

Cologne Cable Car
List of gondola lifts
Emirates Air Line (cable car)

References

External links

 IGA Cable Car official website
 IGA Cable Car on the Berliner official website

Berlin IGA 2017
Transport in Berlin
Tourist attractions in Berlin
Buildings and structures in Marzahn-Hellersdorf
Transport infrastructure completed in 2017
2017 establishments in Germany